The list of ship commissionings in 1954 includes a chronological list of all ships commissioned in 1954.


See also 

1954
 Ship commissionings